William Hatton may refer to:
 William Hatton (pioneer), Early Carmel Valley, California pioneer
 William H. Hatton, American lumberman and politician

See also